Prior to its uniform adoption of proportional representation in 1999, the United Kingdom used first-past-the-post for the European elections in England, Scotland and Wales. The European Parliament constituencies used under that system were smaller than the later regional constituencies and only had one Member of the European Parliament each.

The constituency of Birmingham South was one of them.

It consisted of the Westminster Parliament constituencies of Birmingham Edgbaston, Birmingham Hall Green, Birmingham Handsworth, Birmingham Ladywood, Birmingham Northfield, Birmingham Selly Oak, Birmingham Small Heath, Birmingham Sparkbrook, and Birmingham Yardley.

Member of the European Parliament

Results

References

External links
 David Boothroyd's United Kingdom Election Results 

European Parliament constituencies in England (1979–1999)
Politics of Birmingham, West Midlands
1979 establishments in England
1984 disestablishments in England
Constituencies established in 1979
Constituencies disestablished in 1984